Cylindera cursitans is an extant species of tiger beetle in the genus Cylindera:

References

cursitans
Beetles described in 1857